The 2001 season was the Hawthorn Football Club's 77th season in the Australian Football League and 100th overall.

Fixture

Premiership season

Finals series

Ladder

References

Hawthorn Football Club seasons